Phrynopus horstpauli is a species of frog in the family Strabomantidae.
It is endemic to Peru.
Its natural habitats are subtropical or tropical moist montane forest, subtropical or tropical high-altitude shrubland, pastureland, and rural gardens.
It is threatened by habitat loss.

References

horstpauli
Amphibians of the Andes
Amphibians of Peru
Endemic fauna of Peru
Taxonomy articles created by Polbot
Amphibians described in 2000